Jing Tian-Zörner (born 9 February 1963) is a Chinese-born German table tennis player. She represented Germany at the 2000 Summer Olympics.

References

1963 births
Living people
Table tennis players from Sichuan
German female table tennis players
Chinese emigrants to Germany
Chinese female table tennis players
Table tennis players at the 2000 Summer Olympics
Olympic table tennis players of Germany
Naturalised table tennis players